John de Egglescliffe (died 1347) was a 14th-century English bishop. Little is known of his personal background except that he was an Augustinian friar, and that he probably came from County Durham (there is a parish called Egglescliffe there).

In early 1317, Stephen de Donydouer was elected by the canons of the see of Glasgow as bishop of Glasgow. After election, Stephen travelled to the Holy See to receive consecration, but the pope, Pope John XXII rejected his election under pressure from King Edward II of England. A letter dated 13 July 1317 was sent by King Edward thanking the pope for refusing to accept the election. On 18 August, the pope had learned of Stephen's death, and announced that he would appoint a bishop himself.

The pope instructed Nicholas Alberti, Bishop of Ostia, to appoint and consecrate the English papal penitentiary John de Ecclescliffe to the bishopric of Glasgow. This went ahead at Avignon at some point before 17 July 1318. Meanwhile, ignorant of the pope's reservation, the Glasgow canons elected John de Lindesay.  As an Egglescliffe was regarded as a pro-English appointee, Egglescliffe never took possession of this see. However, John was given another see to take charge, as in March 1323 he was translated to the bishopric of Connor. This did not last long though, as he was soon translated again, this time to the bishopric of Llandaff on 20 June 1323, i.e., just three months after becoming bishop of Connor. He remained Bishop of Llandaff for twenty-four years, and died in 1347.

References
Dowden, John, The Bishops of Scotland, ed. J. Maitland Thomson, (Glasgow, 1912)

13th-century births
1347 deaths
Augustinian friars
Bishops of Glasgow
Bishops of Llandaff
People from County Durham
14th-century Scottish Roman Catholic bishops
14th-century Roman Catholic bishops in Ireland
14th-century Roman Catholic bishops in Wales
English bishops